Sergei Tretyakov (1834 - 25 July 1892) was a Russian philanthropist and patron of the arts, who co-founded the Tretyakov Gallery in Moscow with his brother Pavel Tretyakov.

Tretyakov Gallery
In 1851, Tretyakov and his brother Pavel Tretyakov acquired a property on the right bank of the Moskva River to use as offices, also using the building to house their art collection, which became known as the Tretyakov Gallery. Sergei's collection was smaller than his brother's, but also very valuable. The first work to be added to his collection was Alexey Bogolyubov's Ipatievsky Monastery near Kostroma. He later began collecting primarily works from Western European artists, especially French romantics and realists.

On Sergei's death in 1892, both brothers' collections were donated to the Moscow city administrators. The brothers' combined collections consisted of 1,287 paintings, 518 drawings and 9 sculptures by Russian artists, along with 75 paintings and eight drawings by European artists, mainly French and German masters of the late 19th century. The value of the donated collections was estimated at 1,429,000 roubles. The city converted the brothers' private showroom into a gallery accessible to the public, free of charge. The official opening of the Moscow City Gallery of Pavel and Sergei Tretyakov, as it was then named, took place on 15 August 1893, with over 700 visitors on the first day.

Other activities
He was also the chief of the Moscow municipal administration, from 1876 to 1882.

References

1834 births
1892 deaths
Philanthropists from the Russian Empire
Russian art patrons
Tretyakov Gallery
19th-century philanthropists
Mayors of Moscow